The Spanish expression  ('the people' or 'the community'; literal translation: 'the race') has historically been used to refer to the Hispanophone populations (primarily though not always exclusively in the Western Hemisphere), considered as an ethnic or racial unit historically deriving from the Spanish Empire, and the process of racial intermixing of the Spanish colonizers with the indigenous populations of the Americas (some utilizations of the term include racial mixing with enslaved Africans brought there by the Atlantic slave trade).

It remains in active use specifically in the context of Mexican-American identity politics in the United States.

History

 

Chilean foreign vice-secretary Germán Vergara Donoso commented that the "profound significance of the celebration was the intimate inter-penetration of the homage to the Race and the devotion to Our Lady of the Pillar, i.e. the symbol of the ever more extensive union between America and Spain."

Francisco Franco wrote a novel under the pen name "Jaime de Andrade" which was turned into the film Raza of 1942. The Monumento a la Raza was inaugurated in Mexico City in 1940. La Raza metro station in Mexico City was inaugurated in 1978.

The term  (feminine ) likewise arose in the early 20th century as a designation of Mexicans. In the 1960s to 1970s, the term became associated with the Chicano Movement in relation to Mexican-American identity politics activism.
In the United States, the terms  and  subsequently became closely associated. Various Hispanic groups in the United States still use the term. The Raza Unida Party was active as a political party representing Mexican-American racial identity politics in the 1970s. The Hispanic advocacy organization National Council of La Raza was formed in 1968 (renamed to UnidosUS in 2017).

La Raza was the name of a Chicano community newspaper edited by Eliezer Risco in 1968.  Risco was one of the "LA Thirteen", a group of young Mexican-American men who were political activists identified by the government as being leaders of a Brown Power movement in Los Angeles. Raul Ruiz joined the staff of La Raza while a student at California State University, Los Angeles. Other community newspapers of the time were Inside Eastside and Chicano Student Movement. Ruiz, a key journalist in the movement, eventually became the editor of La Raza. It became the most influential Chicano-movement publication in southern California. The publications filled a void: for the most part, there had heretofore been no media coverage of any type for the Brown Power movement and its activities. The movement's own print-media publications were really the only forum that the Brown Power movement had to keep party members informed about what was going on in the movement across the Los Angeles area. The lack of the mainstream media coverage contributed to silencing the movement and its activities, unlike with the Black Power movement; the latter received much more coverage, which contributed to that movement's success in spreading their message and growing their movement.

See also
 
 Clash of Civilizations
 
 Pan-Latinism
 Race and ethnicity in Latin America
 Race and ethnicity in the United States
 Racial politics
 
 Panhispanism

References

 
Latin American culture
Race in Latin America
Identity politics in the United States